Richard "Ric" W. Metzgar (born November 28, 1953) is an American politician from Maryland. He is a member of the Republican party, and currently serves as a member of the Maryland House of Delegates from District 6, representing Southeast Baltimore County.

Early life and career 
Metzgar was born in Essex, Maryland on November 28, 1953. He attended Kenwood High School in Essex, and graduated from Northwest Bible College in Minot, North Dakota with a clinical pastoral education certificate and from the Community College of Baltimore County in Dundalk, Maryland. He is a small business owner, working as the general manager of G&W Motors from 1989 to 2015 and as the president of My Son's Parking, Inc. from 1994 to 1998. He also worked as an associate pastor at Essex Church of God from 2004 to 2014.

In 2006, Metzgar was an unsuccessful candidate for the Maryland House of Delegates in District 6, receiving only 10.9 percent of the vote in the general election.

Metzgar was elected to the Maryland House of Delegates alongside Republicans Robin Grammer Jr. and Robert B. Long in the 2014 Maryland House of Delegates election.

Metzgar served as an alternative delegate for the 2020 Republican National Convention.

In the legislature 
Metzgar was sworn into the Maryland House of Delegates on January 14, 2015.

A 2021 analysis by the Maryland Free Enterprise Foundation, a business advocacy group, gave Metzgar a score of 81 percent, making him the least business-friendly Republican in the Maryland General Assembly.

Committee assignments 
 Appropriations Committee, 2019–present (transportation & the environment subcommittee, 2020–present; oversight committee on pensions, 2020–present)
 Ways and Means Committee, 2015–2017 (education subcommittee, 2015–2017; revenues subcommittee, 2015–2017)
 Tax Credit Evaluation Committee, 2015–2017
 Health and Government Operations Committee, 2017–2019 (government operations & long-term care subcommittee, 2017; insurance subcommittee, 2017–2018; public health & minority health disparities subcommittee, 2017–2018; health occupations & long-term care subcommittee, 2019; insurance & pharmaceuticals subcommittee, 2019)

Other memberships 
 Maryland Veterans Caucus, 2015-

Electoral history

References 

1953 births
Living people
21st-century American politicians
Republican Party members of the Maryland House of Delegates